Dragan Obradović (born 19 March 1957) is a Yugoslav rower. He competed in the men's quadruple sculls event at the 1980 Summer Olympics.

References

1957 births
Living people
Yugoslav male rowers
Olympic rowers of Yugoslavia
Rowers at the 1980 Summer Olympics
Place of birth missing (living people)